Ambresbury Banks is the name given to the remains of an Iron Age hill fort in Epping Forest, Essex, England.

Description
The fort encircles an area of 4.5 hectares (11 acres) and is surrounded by a single bank of 2 m (6 ft) in height, together with a ditch. There is a small counterscarp bank on the outside lip of the ditch. The defences now have 6 major breaks in their circumference; only one appears to be original. This is approached from the north west by a trapezoidal causeway. The ends of the bank at this point were revetted with coursed puddingstone blocks. The width of the passageway was sufficient to suggest double gates, but no central postholes were found. Finds at the site have included shards of red, grey and black pottery, flints and flint arrow heads, and lumps of baked clay. These suggest a construction date of around 700 BC and occupation until 42 AD.

The area within and around the fort is now completely wooded, although in Iron Age times it would have been cleared of trees to enable a better field of view, and for agriculture. This has been suggested by evidence of wild service trees, which are an indicator of regrown forest.

The Ambresbury Banks site has been examined archaeologically 9 times; the first excavation was by Augustus Pitt-Rivers in 1881. Ambresbury Banks is a scheduled monument.

Legend
According to legend, it is the site of the last stand by Boudica against the Romans in the year 61. There is no evidence to support this. Another legend contends that the construction and name derive from the fifth-century hero Ambrosius Aurelianus, so contradicting the supposed connection to the first-century battle;  other theories for the location of the battlefield include Mancetter in Warwickshire and Kings Cross in London. Nevertheless, Ambresbury Banks forms, along with Loughton Camp, Wallbury Camp, Little Hadham, Barkway and Littlebury, a line of hill-forts that arguably delineate the disputed territories of the warring Trinovantes and Catuvellauni.

References 

Hill forts in Essex
History of Essex
Epping Forest District